Dennis Severs' House in Folgate Street, London is a "still-life drama" created by Dennis Severs, who owned and lived in it until his death, as a "historical imagination" of what life would have been like inside for a family of Huguenot silk weavers. It is a Grade II listed Georgian terraced house in Spitalfields in the East End, Central London, England. From 1979 to 1999 it was lived in by Dennis Severs, who gradually recreated the rooms as a time capsule in the style of former centuries. Severs' friend Dan Cruickshank said: "It was never meant to be an accurate historical creation of a specific moment – it was an evocation of a world. It was essentially a theatre set."

After closing due to the Covid pandemic, the house reopened to the public on 29 July 2021. A large trove of audio tapes that were found have been condensed to create a new , conducted by an actor. The house's Latin motto  is Aut Visum Aut Non!: "You either see it or you don't."

The house
The house is on the south side of Folgate Street and dates from approximately 1724.  It is one of a terrace of houses (No.s 6–18) built of brown brick with red-brick dressings, over four storeys and with a basement.  The listing for the house, compiled in 1950, describes No. 18 as having a painted facade, and with first-floor window frames enriched with a trellis pattern. By 1979 the house was very run-down; it was saved by the Spitalfields Historic Buildings Trust, an architectural preservation charity.

History

Dennis Severs (16 November 1948, California, US – 27 December 1999, London) was drawn to London by what he called "English light", and bought the dilapidated property in Folgate Street from the Spitalfields Trust in 1979. This area of the East End of London, next to Spitalfields Market, had become very run-down, and artists had started to move in.  Bohemian visual artists Gilbert & George added to the flavour of the neighbourhood; resident there since the late 1960s, they also refurbished a similar house. In addition, the historian and writer Raphael Samuel lived in the area. The group of people Severs was a part of, who began renovating houses in Spitalfields in the 1980s, is sometimes referred to as the Neo-Georgians.

Severs started on a programme to refurbish the ten rooms of his house, each in a different historic style, mainly from the 18th and 19th centuries. The rooms are arranged as if they are in use and the occupants have only just left. The rooms contain objects either of the period, or made by Severs. An authentic-looking 17th-century swag over a fireplace was made of varnished walnuts. A four-poster bed, that Severs slept in, was made of pallets and polystyrene. There are displays of items such as half-eaten bread, and different smells and background sounds for each room. The Victorian poverty and squalor room had smells described as disgusting, but real. 

Woven through the house is the story of the fictional Jervis family (a name anglicised from Gervais), originally immigrant Huguenot silk weavers, who lived at the house from 1725 to 1919. Each room evokes incidental moments in the lives of these imaginary inhabitants. Peter Ackroyd, author of London: the biography, wrote:

Cultural studies researcher Hedvig Mårdh writes that Dennis Severs' House is "admittedly difficult to categorize" and that it combines scenography and artwork.   The art form practised by Severs has been described as "a type of theatre unique and rare"; in Severs' obituary, Gavin Stamp defined the house as "a three-dimensional historical novel, written in brick and candlelight". Severs himself offered the term "still-life drama", which today is used in a number of notes that guide silent visitors around the house. He wrote, to describe his endeavour:

Writer and illustrator Brian Selznick used the house as an inspiration for his 2015 novel The Marvels. The book concludes with a short history and photographs of Dennis Severs. Many of the characters' names and story lines are similar to what can be found in the museum.

The writer Jeanette Winterson, who also restored a derelict house nearby to live in, observed,  "Fashions come and go, but there are permanencies, vulnerable but not forgotten, that Dennis sought to communicate".  Painter David Hockney described the house as one of the world's greatest works of opera.

The house was bought by the Spitalfields Trust shortly before Severs, long HIV-positive, died of cancer two days after Christmas 1999. Severs wrote before his death "I have recently come to accept what I refused to accept for so long: that the house is only ephemeral. That no one can put a preservation order on atmosphere." Nonetheless, the house was preserved, and open to the public, who are asked during their visit to respect the intent of the creator and participate in an imaginary journey to another time.

Television 
Severs appeared as himself on an episode of Tell The Truth on Channel 4, dated 9 November 1984, discussing the house.

References

External links 

 
 Guardian Unlimited: Balconies and bedsteads
 "The repair team preserving an 18th Century home" BBC News, 26 July 2021 
 

Living museums in England
Museums with year of establishment missing
History of the London Borough of Tower Hamlets
Houses in the London Borough of Tower Hamlets
Museums in the London Borough of Tower Hamlets
Spitalfields
Grade II listed buildings in the London Borough of Tower Hamlets
Grade II listed houses in London